Hamborn Abbey is a Premonstratensian monastery in the Alt-Hamborn district of Duisburg, Germany. The abbey is physically located in the diocese of Essen, although not formally part of it.

History
The present abbey church originates in a small parish church built on an estate called "Havenburn" by the lords of Hochstaden in the 9th century.

Over time, the landowners leased the land surrounding the farm to peasants who settled here. Soon the name of the estate passed to the entire parish. The parish of Hamborn later became an independent jurisdiction.

In 1136 Gerhard von Hochstaden gave his possessions in Hamborn to the Archbishop of Cologne on condition that a Premonstratensian monastery should be built in the place of the parish church. After the conversion of the parish church to a Premonstratensian church and the construction of the cloister and the rest of the conventual buildings, the site was consecrated in 1170 and became an abbey.

After the Napoleonic occupation of the Rhineland by the French army this monastery was abolished, like almost  all others. While the monastic estates fell to the state, the church was kept for the people of Hamborn as a parish church.

During World War II the abbey and the church were largely destroyed by Allied air raids.

As part of the re-foundation of the diocese of Essen in 1958 Hamborn Abbey was re-established in 1959 and settled by Premonstratensians from Rot an der Rot Abbey. In 1994 it regained its abbatial status.

As of 2018 the community contains 23 canons including the abbot since 1995, Albert Thomas Dölken O.Praem. The canons are mostly engaged in pastoral work in the Duisburg area, but in addition some are also active in the diocesan administration, in secondary and higher education and as academics, as well as in various welfare and social projects. Besides its premises in Duisburg, Hamborn Abbey also oversees the Premonstratensian community in Magdeburg consisting of three monks, as an independent priory.  The canons of Hamborn also undertake pastoral care in the former Premonstratensian abbeys of Cappenberg and Sayn.

The steady growth of the community made necessary the enlargement of the premises of the buildings, and a new building was dedicated in 2011.

On the abbey site are now also the Abbey School, the Abbey Centre, which is used in particular for conferences and cultural events and is equipped with a tourist office, as well as St. John's Hospital. The abbey is on the social front line of northern Duisburg with the notorious districts of Marxloh and Bruckhausen in an area that no longer has a Christian majority, and this sets the parameters of the abbey's social and pastoral work.

Besides the abbey church with its sights, the treasury can also be visited.

Abbots and provosts

From 1959

 Albert Thomas Dölken, abbot since 1995
 Gottfried Reinhold Menne, prelate 1988–1995 
 Florian Joseph Pröll, abbot of Schlägl Abbey, abbey administrator 1965–1988
 Bernhard Mayer, prelate 1959 to 1965

abbey closed 1806 – 1958

12th century to 1806
 Karl Adalbert von Bayer, abbot 1790 – 1806
 Alexander von der Horst, abbot 1782 – 1790
 Ferdinand von Dunckel, abbot 1757 – 1782
 Johan Arnold von Houven, abbot 1742 – 1757
 Heinrich von Daell, abbot 1726–1742
 Gottfried von Bemmel, abbot 1724 – 1726
 Wilhelm Heinrich von Bentinck, abbot 1705 – 1724
 Johann von Breidenbach, abbot 1694 – 1705
 Johann von Breidenbach, abbot 1677 – 1694
 Johann Albert Heerdt, abbot 1672 – 1677
 Wilhelm Gottfried von Hyllen, abbot 1647 – 1672
 Stephan von Stein, abbot 1619 – 1646
 Wilhelm Ingenhoven zu Gelinde, abbot 1603 – 1619
 Christoph von Husen, abbot 1553 – 1582
 Albert Hane, abbot 1544 – 1553
 Wilhelm von Wyenhorst, abbot 1517 – 1543
 Johann Stael von Holstein, abbot 1487 – 1517
 Elbert van den Bongart, abbot 1483 – 1487
 Hermann von Hiesfeld, abbot 1487
 Heinrich Rinsche, abbot 1451 – 1476
 Dietrich Estas, abbot 1426 – 1451
 Berthold von Brabeck, abbot 1417 – 1424
 Konstantin Kron, abbot 1392 – 1414
 Heinrich van den Berghe, abbot 1350 – 1388
 Heinrich Stecke, abbot 1325 – 1345
 Johann, abbot 1321 – 1322
 Arnold, abbot 1314 – 1318
 Gerhard, abbot 1308
 Christian, abbot 1306 – 1310
 Drudo, abbot to 1301
 Conrad, abbot 1297 – 1299
 Gottfried, abbot in 1295
 Laurentius, abbot 1287 – 1291
 Johann, abbot 1281 – 1290
 Gottschalk of Befreyt, abbot to 1272
 Dietrich, abbot to 1268
 Philipp, abbot in 1252
 Hermann von Holte, abbot 1231 – 1234
 Friedrich, abbot 1216 – 1230
 Dietrich, provost by 1208
 Volkwin, abbot 12th / 13th Century
 Gottfried, abbot 1195 – 1200
 Allardus, abbot 12th century
 Nicholas, provost 12th century
 Gernod, provost 1157 – 1166
 Lambert, provost in 1147

Gallery

Organ
The organ in the abbey church was built in 1986 by the firm of Mönch in Überlingen. The instrument has 45 registers with 3181 pipes on three manuals and pedal.

References

Premonstratensian monasteries in Germany
Monasteries in North Rhine-Westphalia